Aleksandr Vladimirovich Vasilenko (born 30 October 1986) is a Russian former professional football player.

Career
Vasilenko has played in the Russian Football National League with FC Ufa on two occasions, with a six-month spell at FC Avangard Kursk in between.

References

External links
 

1986 births
Living people
Russian footballers
FC Asmaral Moscow players
FC Ufa players
FC Fakel Voronezh players
Association football defenders
FC Avangard Kursk players
FC Dynamo Vologda players